Karl Dempwolf is a contemporary California Plein-Air Painter who is known for his California Landscapes. He is a Signature Member of the California Art Club (f. 1909), and serves in its Advisory Board of Directors.

Youth and Training
Karl Dempwolf was born in Delmenhorst, Germany. As a child, he spent the war years in Bavaria - a picture-perfect countryside with pristine natural surroundings: sparkling lakes, national parks and nature reserves, mist-enshrouded forests, sun-drenched vineyards, dramatic hills and, of course, the majestic Alps - where he developed his love for nature.
In 1954, at the age fourteen, he and his family immigrated to the United States aboard the S.S. America, at the request of the Lockheed Corporation, where his father was to serve as an aerospace engineer.
Dempwolf attended Van Nuys High where he played basketball, then continued his education at California State University, Northridge where he studied art and photography, and became the school's very first All-American athlete.
His training includes the Art Center College of Design (1969) and studies with Hans Burkhardt. He also has a master's degree in Fine Arts from the University of Southern California (1974).

Early career
In the mid 1970s, with an interest and a background in art and photography, Dempwolf enjoyed a first career as an award-winning producer and director of documentaries.
During this period he filmed a story that touched many viewers, recording the life of Dominic Calicchio, a craftsman who made prized trumpets by hand working out of his Hollywood home. During World War II, when brass was in short supply, he made his own metal alloy, and continued his trade in peacetime. Dempwolf filmed him every weekend for two years and the resulting film took many awards. The Council on International Non-Theatrical Events awarded him their Golden Eagle and he took Best in Show at the Bellevue International Film Festival in Washington.

Painting career
With time, however, painting emerged as Karl Dempwolf's true passion: Early California artists such as William Wendt (1865-1946), Guy Rose (1867-1925), Charles Reiffel (1862-1942), William Ritschel (1864-1949), Edgar Payne (1883-1947) and others, as well as American Impressionist Childe Hassam (1859-1935), became his artistic icons. Additionally, the American Arts & Crafts Movement has been an inspiration for Dempwolf. The movement professed the idea that Art has the power to give the viewer a much needed spiritual lift. Jean Stern, Executive Director of the Irvine Museum in Irvine, California, writes: "…Karl’s paintings are richer with the lessons of Modernism. His forceful use of line gives his paintings great strength and intense formal qualities, and his luxurious use of color imparts a profound yet impassioned consciousness."

Exhibitions
2014 – 103rd Annual California Art Club Gold Medal Juried Exhibition, Autry National Center of the American West
2014 – "Empathy for Beauty in the 21st Century," Carnegie Art Museum
2014 – "Legendary Landmarks of California," CAC Gallery at The Old Mill, San Marino, California
2014 – "The Missions of California: celebrating Father Serra’s 300th Birthday," Cathedral of Our Lady of the Angels, Los Angeles
2013 – 102nd Annual California Art Club Gold Medal Juried Exhibition, USC Fisher Museum of Art
2013 – "Then and Now: One Hundred Years of California Impressionism," The Palos Verdes Art Center
2013 – "Along El Camino Real: Missions of California," CAC Gallery at The Old Mill, San Marino, California
2012 – 101st Annual California Art Club Gold Medal Juried Exhibition, Autry National Center
2012 – "Saving Paradise: The Symbiosis of Landscape Painting and Environmental Awareness," The Bennington Center for the Arts, Vermont
2012 – "Saving Paradise," Los Angeles Municipal Art Gallery
2012 – "Catalina: The Wild Side," Catalina Island Conservancy
2012 – "On Location in Malibu," Frederick R. Weisman Museum, Pepperdine University, Malibu
2012 – "Monumental Miniatures III," CAC Gallery at The Old Mill, San Marino, California
2011 – 100th Annual California Art Club Gold Medal Juried Exhibition, Pasadena Museum of California Art 
2011 – "Splendor: Paintings of the Tejon Ranch," Bakersfield Museum of Art
2011 – "Gold Coast: Paintings of Southern California," Oceanside Art Museum
2011 – "A Luminous Land," Carnegie Art Museum, Oxnard, California
2011 – "Gems from the Central Coast," San Luis Obispo Museum of Art
2011 – "California Dreamin'," CAC Gallery at The Old Mill, San Marino, California
2011 – "Capturing California's Preserved Lands and Historic Districts," CAC Gallery at The Old Mill, San Marino, California
2010 - 99th Annual California Art Club Gold Medal Juried Exhibition, Pasadena Museum of California Art
2010 – "Capturing California’s Preserved Lands: Gems from the Central Coast," CAC Gallery at The Old Mill, San Marino, California
2010 – "Historic Landmarks and Districts of Southern California," CAC Gallery at The Old Mill, San Marino, California
2010 – "Visions of the San Gabriels," CAC Gallery at The Old Mill, San Marino, California
2009 - 98th Annual California Art Club Juried Exhibition, Pasadena Museum of California Art 
2009 – "California's Landscapes and Legacy," The Bennington Center for the Arts, Vermont
2009 – "On Location in Malibu," Frederick R. Weisman Museum, Pepperdine University, Malibu
2009 - "California Art Club: Artists Explore Los Angeles," Los Angeles Area Chamber of Commerce
2009 – "Paintings from the Southern Sierra Foothills," CAC Gallery at The Old Mill, San Marino, California
2008 - 97th Annual California Art Club Gold Medal Juried Exhibition, Pasadena Museum of California Art
2007 - 96th Annual California Art Club Gold Medal Juried Exhibition, Pasadena Museum of California Art
2007 – "Exhibition of California Landscape Paintings," Historic George H. Maxwell House, Pasadena 
2006 - 95th Annual California Art Club Gold Medal Juried Exhibition, Pasadena Museum of California Art
2006 – "On Location in Malibu," Frederick R. Weisman Museum of Art, Pepperdine University, Malibu
2005 – "Monumental Miniatures 2," CAC Gallery at The Old Mill, San Marino California
2004 – 94th Annual California Art Club Gold Medal Juried Exhibition, Pasadena Museum of California Art
2004 – "Expressions of Winter," CAC Gallery at The Old Mill, San Marino, California
2003 - 93rd Annual California Art Club Gold Medal Juried Exhibition, Pasadena Museum of California Art
2003 – "Sights of Southern California," Bowers Museum of Cultural Art
2003 – "9th Annual California Art Club Plein Air Painting," Mission San Juan Capistrano
2002 – 92nd Annual California Art Club Gold Medal Juried Exhibition, Pasadena Museum of History
2002 – "Salon D’Automne: The Third Annual California Autumn Salon," Edenhurst Gallery and Morseburg Galleries
2002 – "8th Annual California Art Club Plein Air Painting," Mission San Juan Capistrano
2001 – 91st Annual California Art Club Gold Medal Juried Exhibition, Pasadena Historical Museum
2001 – "7th Annual California Art Club Plein Air Painting," Mission San Juan Capistrano
2001 – "Sights and Sounds of Santa Ana," Bowers Museum of Cultural Art 
2001 – "Gardens of the Huntington, II," CAC Gallery at The Old Mill, San Marino, California
2001 – "Contemporary Views of L.A.'s Historic Chinatown," CAC Gallery at The Old Mill, San Marino, California
2000 – 90th Annual California Art Club Gold Medal Juried Exhibition, Pasadena Historical Museum
2000 – "On Location in Malibu," Phippen Museum, Prescott, Arizona
1999 – "On Location in Malibu," Frederick R. Weisman Museum of Art, Pepperdine University, Malibu
1999 – "Sights of Santa Ana: Scenes of Orange County," Bowers Museum of Cultural Art
1998 – "Treasures of the Sierra Nevada," Natural History Museum of Los Angeles
1998 - "Treasures of the Sierra Nevada," Muckenthaler Cultural Center, Fullerton, California
1997 – "Sights and Sounds of Santa Ana," Bowers Museum of Cultural Art
1996 – "California Wetlands: Paintings of California’s Endangered and Protected Wetlands," Natural History Museum of Los Angeles County
1996 – "Puertas del Santuario: Paintings of the Mission San Juan Capistrano," Carnegie Art Museum, Oxnard
1995 – "Modern Masters of Landscape Paintings," California Heritage Art Gallery, San Francisco

Permanent Public Collections
Collection of Chancellor Angela Merkel of Germany, presented as a diplomatic gift by Barack Obama
Arts for the Parks, Permanent Collection
McGraw Hill Publishers, Permanent Collection

Awards
Karl Dempwolf's work has received wide recognition including the Lifetime Achievement Award granted byEric Rhoads'  Streamline Publishing, producers of Plein Air and Fine Arts Connosieur magazines, at the Plein Air Convention held in San Diego in 2017.

See also  
California Art Club
California Plein-Air Painting
En plein air
Landscape art
California Impressionism

References

Books and Magazine References
Stern, Jean and Siple, Molly.  "California Light, A Century of Landscapes," Skira Rizzoli, A Division of Rizzoli International Publications, Inc., 2011
Sherman Pearl, Melissa, "Destination Art," California Homes Magazine, April 2006
American Art Collector Magazine, January 2006
Sherman Pearl, Melissa, "Karl Dempwolf Expresses His Passion for the Masters," California Homes Magazine, March 2003
Orange County Magazine, Annual Edition, Front Cover, 2003
Metzger, Phillip W., Author, Rubin Wolf, Rachel, Editor, "Art from the Parks," North Light Books, September 1, 2000

Catalogs
California Art Club: 103rd Annual Gold Medal Juried Exhibition, 2014 (CAC Exhibition Catalog), Artist Entry and illustration
"Empathy for Beauty in the 21st Century," Carnegie Art Museum, 2014
California Art Club 102nd Annual Gold Medal Juried Exhibition, 2013 (CAC Exhibition Catalog), Artist Entry and illustration
"Then and Now: One Hundred Years if California Impressionism," Palos Verdes Art center, 2013
California Art Club 101st Annual Gold Medal Juried Exhibition, 2012 (CAC Exhibition Catalog), Artist Entry and illustration
"Saving Paradise: The Symbiosis of Landscape Painting and Environmental Awareness," The Bennington Center for the Arts, Vermont, 2012 
California Art Club 100th Annual Gold Medal Juried Exhibition, 2011 (CAC Exhibition Catalog), Artist Entry and illustration
"Splendor: Paintings of the Tejon Ranch," Bakersfield Museum of Art, 2011
California Art Club 99th Annual Gold Medal Juried Exhibition, 2010 (CAC Exhibition Catalog), Artist Entry and illustration
California Art Club 98th Annual Gold Medal Juried Exhibition, 2009 (CAC Exhibition Catalog), Artist Entry and illustration
"On Location in Malibu," Frederick R. Weisman Museum of Art, Pepperdine University, Malibu, 2009
"California's Landscapes and Legacy," The Bennington Center for the Arts, Vermont, 2009
California Art Club 97th Annual Gold Medal juried exhibition, 2008 (CAC Exhibition Catalog), Artist Entry and illustration
California Art Club 96th Annual Gold Medal Juried Exhibition, 2007 (CAC Exhibition Catalog), Artist Entry and illustration
California Art Club 95th Annual Gold Medal Juried Exhibition, 2006 (CAC Exhibition Catalog), Artist Entry and illustration
"On Location in Malibu," Frederick R. Weisman Museum of Art, Pepperdine University, Malibu, 2006
California Art Club 94th Annual Gold Medal Juried Exhibition, 2005 (CAC Exhibition Catalog), Artist Entry and illustration
California Art Club 93rd Annual Gold Medal Juried Exhibition, 2003 (CAC Exhibition Catalog), Artist Entry and illustration
"Sights of Southern California," Bowers Museum of Cultural Art, Santa Ana, California, 2003
California Art Club 92nd Annual Gold Medal Juried Exhibition, 2002 (CAC Exhibition Catalog), Artist Entry and illustration
California Art Club 91st Annual Gold Medal Juried Exhibition, 2001 (CAC Exhibition Catalog), Artist Entry and illustration
California Art Club 90th Annual Gold Medal Juried Exhibition, 2000 (CAC Exhibition Catalog), Artist Entry and illustration
"On Location in Malibu," Phippen Museum, Prescott, Arizona, 2000
"Treasures of the Sierra Nevada," Natural History Museum of Los Angeles County, Los Angeles, California 1998
"Arts for the Parks: Artists Celebrating our National Parks," National Park Foundation, 1998

External links
California Art Club Web Site

20th-century American painters
American male painters
21st-century American painters
21st-century American male artists
Artists from California
Landscape artists
1939 births
People from Bavaria
Living people
German emigrants to the United States
20th-century American male artists